The  Green Bay Blizzard season was the team's eighth season as a football franchise and first in the Indoor Football League. One of twenty-five teams competing in the IFL for the 2010 season, the Blizzard were members of the Central North Division of the United Conference. The team played their home games at the Resch Center in the Green Bay suburb of Ashwaubenon, Wisconsin.

Schedule

Regular season

Playoffs

Roster

Standings

References

External links
Green Bay Blizzard official website
Green Bay Blizzard official statistics

Green Bay Blizzard seasons
Green Bay Blizzard
Sports in Green Bay, Wisconsin
Green Bay Blizzard